The 2019 Newcastle City Council elections took place on 2 May 2019, on the same day as other local elections across the United Kingdom.

Ward results

Arthur's Hill

Benwell and Scotswood

Blakelaw

Byker

Callerton and Throckley

Castle

Chapel

Dene and South Gosforth

Denton and Westerhope

Elswick

Fawdon and West Gosforth

Gosforth

Heaton

Kenton

Kingston Park South and Newbiggin Hall

Lemington

Manor Park

Monument

North Jesmond

Ouseburn

Parklands

South Jesmond

Walker

Walkergate

West Fenham

Wingrove

References

2019 English local elections
2019